Shahrak-e Shahid Beheshti (also Romanized as Shahrak-e Shahīd Beheshtī) is a village in Sardarabad Rural District, in the Central District of Shushtar County, Khuzestan Province, Iran. At the 2006 census, its population was 1,809, in 399 families.

References 

Populated places in Shushtar County